There are a small number of French people in Pakistan, consisting mostly of expatriates, employees, French spouses married to Pakistanis and French people of Pakistani descent who moved back into the country, along with Pakistani-born people of French ancestry. There are under 4000 French expatriates in Pakistan. French nationals are working in various branches of Alliance française in Lahore, Karachi and Islamabad for promotion of French culture and language while also teaching French as a second language to the locals. They are also working as visiting faculties in educational institutes such as Pakistan Institute of Fashion and Design.

Education
The École Française d'Islamabad and the École Française de Karachi were formerly in operation.

Notable people
 Julien Columeau - Urdu novelist
 Osman Khalid Butt - actor
 Sonya Jehan - actress
 Sadaf Malaterre - Fashion designer
 Ayub K. Ommaya - scientist

See also
 France-Pakistan relations

References

Pakistan
Pakistan
 
 
Immigration to Pakistan
France–Pakistan relations